Ger or GER may refer to:

Healthcare and science
 Gastroesophageal reflux
 Granular endoplasmic reticulum

Language and writing
 Ger (rune), of the Anglo-Saxon futhark
 German language
Gerund

People
 Ger (Hasidic dynasty)
 Ger toshav, the biblical term for a resident alien
 Convert to Judaism

Given name or nickname 
 Ger Blok (1939–2016), Dutch football manager
 Ger Brennan, Irish Gaelic footballer
 Ger Canning (born 1951), Irish sports commentator
 Ger Challa (born 1928), Dutch chemist
 Ger Connolly (born 1937), Irish politician
 Ger Cunningham (born 1961), Irish hurler
 Ger Duany (born 1978), South Sudanese actor and model
 Ger Egan (born 1990/1991), Westmeath Gaelic footballer
 Ger van Elk (1941–2014), Dutch artist
 Ger Feeney (–2010), Irish Gaelic footballer
 Ger Farragher (born 1983), Irish hurler
 Ger Henderson (born 1954), Irish hurler
 Ger Houlahan, Irish Gaelic footballer
 Ger Lagendijk (1941–2010), Dutch footballer
 Ger Loughnane (born 1953), Irish hurler
 Ger Lynch (born 1958), Irish Gaelic footballer
 Ger Manley (born 1968), Irish hurler
 Ger Maycock (1970–2006), Irish artist
 Ger McDonnell (1971–2008), Irish mountaineer
 Ger O'Driscoll (disambiguation)
 Ger Reddin (born 1988), Irish hurler
 Ger Reidy (born 1986), Irish Gaelic footballer
 Ger Robinson (born 1982), Irish association footballer
 Ger Ryan, Irish actress
 Ger Senden (born 1971), Dutch footballer
 Ger Spillane (born 1981), Irish Gaelic footballer

Places
 Ger, Girona, Catalonia, Spain
 Ger, Hautes-Pyrénées, France
 Ger, Manche, France
 Ger, Pyrénées-Atlantiques, France
 Ger district, a type of residential district in Mongolia
 Ger River, in Saint Lucia
 Germany, IOC and UNDP codes
 Góra Kalwaria, Mazovian Voivodship, Poland
 Shiquanhe, Tibet, historically called Ger

Transportation
 Gerrards Cross railway station, Buckinghamshire, National Rail station code GER
 Great Eastern Railway, a British railway company
 Rafael Cabrera Mustelier Airport, serving Nueva Gerona, Cuba, IATA code GER

Other uses
 Ger (magazine), an online Mongolian magazine
 Great Eastern Run, a running event in Peterborough, United Kingdom
 Gross enrolment ratio
 Migration Period spear
 Yurt

See also
Gers (disambiguation)